Bude–Stratton is a civil parish in Cornwall, England. The largest settlement in the parish is the seaside town of Bude.  The parish also includes the market town of Stratton and the settlements of Flexbury, Poughill, Bush, Maer and Northcott north of Bude, and Upton, Lynstone, Thorne and Hele south of Bude.

In the 2011 census the population of the civil parish was 9,934.

Bude–Stratton is part of the North Cornwall parliamentary constituency, represented since 2015 by Scott Mann MP.

History 
Bude–Stratton originated in 1900 as an urban district.  It was formed from parts of the civil parishes of Stratton (Bude, Stratton, Upton and Lynstone) and Poughill (Flexbury).  In 1934 the urban district was enlarged to absorb the remainder of the civil parishes of Stratton and Poughill (including the village of Poughill), which were then abolished.

The boundaries of the urban district were then unchanged until 1974, when it was abolished and became part of the new North Cornwall District. Bude–Stratton was reformed as a successor parish, a civil parish with more limited powers than the former urban district.  The parish council of the civil parish resolved to declare its area a "town", with the council known as a "town council".  In April 2009 North Cornwall District was abolished and replaced by Cornwall Council. 

The arms of the Bude-Stratton urban district council were: Arg. two bars wavy Az. within a bordure Sa. bezantee on a chief Gu. a cross formed of the field between two clarions Or.  The Arms were transferred to Bude-Stratton Town Council by consent and grant of the College of Arms.

Twinning 
Bude–Stratton is twinned with Ergue-Gaberic (An Erge Vras) in Brittany, France.{

Notable people
 John Bolitho, Grand bard of the Cornish Gorsedd
 Sir Goldsworthy Gurney, surgeon, gentleman scientist, inventor, and pioneer of applying steam power
 Sir Henry Lovell Goldsworthy Gurney, colonial administrator

References

External links
 Bude-Stratton Town Council
 Bude-Stratton OCS

Civil parishes in Cornwall
Bude